This is a list of ambassadors to Estonia. Note that some ambassadors are responsible for more than one country while others are directly accredited to Tallinn.

Current Ambassadors to Estonia

See also
 Foreign relations of Estonia
 List of diplomatic missions of Estonia
 List of diplomatic missions in Estonia

References

The Tallinn Diplomatic List, September 2019

Ambassadors to Estonia
 
Estonia